Donacoscaptes marcella is a moth in the family Crambidae. It was described by Schaus in 1913. It is found in Costa Rica.

References

Haimbachiini
Moths described in 1913